William Henry Probert (15 January 1893–1948) was an English footballer who played in the Football League for Fulham and Portsmouth.

References

1893 births
1948 deaths
English footballers
Association football forwards
English Football League players
Portsmouth F.C. players
Southend United F.C. players
Fulham F.C. players